The Boy from Ipanema ( is a 2010 South Korean independent teen fantasy romance film filmed in Busan and Sapporo.

Plot
A young woman falls in love a beach boy who dreams to be in Ipanema.

Cast
 Lee Soo-hyuk as Boy
 Kim Min-ji as Girl
 Chun Woo-hee as Friend

Awards
2010 Jeonju International Film Festival: Audience Critic's Award 
2010 Jeonju International Film Festival: Movie Collage Award

References

External links
 

2010 films
South Korean romantic fantasy films
2010s South Korean films